The A308(M) is a motorway in Berkshire, England. It forms part of the Maidenhead bypass and runs from the M4 at junction 8/9 to the A308 south of Maidenhead town centre. The A308(M) is one of Britain's shortest motorways, and is generally considered to be the second shortest, after the A635(M) on the Mancunian Way.

History
In 1961 the A4(M) was opened and ran from the existing junction 7, through a junction with the A308 and ending at a junction with the A4. In 1963, the Slough bypass was opened to junction 7 and the A4(M) was renumbered M4, junction 8 being with the A308 and junction 9 with the A4.

The proposed route of the M4 was then changed to go south of Reading, instead of north of it. When the M4 was extended in 1971, a new junction was provided to connect with what would become a spur. This new interchange was built too close to the original junction 8, so this had to be closed. A new junction (numbered 8/9 so as not to confuse motorists) was built.  The original M4 north of this was renumbered as the A423(M) and in the 1990s this was again reclassified as the A404(M). A new spur, the A308(M), was built to maintain access to the A308 and connected with the A404(M) and the M4 at the same grade separated roundabout.

Junctions

Information above gathered from Advanced Direction Signs April 2011

See also
List of motorways in the United Kingdom
A404(M) motorway

References

External links

 Pathetic Motorways – A308(M)

Motorways in England
Roads in Berkshire